The Pitchfork Music Festival 2010 was held on July 16 to 18, 2010 at the Union Park, Chicago, United States. The festival was headlined by Modest Mouse, LCD Soundsystem and Pavement.

Lineup
Headline performers are listed in boldface. Artists listed from latest to earliest set times.

Notes

References

External links

Pitchfork Music Festival
2010 music festivals
2010 in American music